I Have Something to Tell You is a 2005 Montenegrin drama film directed by Željko Sošić, in 2005. Montenegro's new cinema starts with this movie.

Cast

Bojan Marović
Dragan Nikolić 
Natasa Ninković
Branimir Popović
Dejan Ivanić 
Marina Savić
Milan Gutović
Varja Đukić

External links 
 

2005 films
Films shot in Montenegro
Montenegrin drama films
Serbian-language films
Montenegrin-language films
Films set in Montenegro
2005 drama films